Plumage ( "feather") is a layer of feathers that covers a bird and the pattern, colour, and arrangement of those feathers. The pattern and colours of plumage differ between species and subspecies and may vary with age classes. Within species, there can be different colour morphs. The placement of feathers on a bird is not haphazard, but rather emerge in organized, overlapping rows and groups, and these  are known by standardized names.

Most birds moult twice a year, resulting in a breeding or nuptial plumage and a basic plumage. Many ducks and some other species such as the red junglefowl have males wearing a bright nuptial plumage while breeding and a drab eclipse plumage for some months afterward.  The painted bunting's juveniles have two inserted moults in their first autumn, each yielding plumage like an adult female.  The first starts a few days after fledging replacing the juvenile plumage with an auxiliary formative plumage; the second a month or so later giving the formative plumage.

Abnormal plumages include a variety of conditions. Albinism, total loss of colour, is rare, but partial loss of colours is more common. Some species are colour polymorphic, having two or more colour variants.  A few species have special types of polymorphism, as in the male ruff which has an assortment of different colours around the head and neck in the breeding season only.

Hen feathering is an inherited plumage character in domestic fowl controlled by a single gene. Plumology (or plumage science) is the name for the science that is associated with the study of feathers.

Humphrey–Parkes (H–P) moult and plumage terminology
Almost all species of birds moult at least annually, usually after the breeding season, known as the pre-basic moult. This resulting covering of feathers, which will last either until the next breeding season or until the next annual moult, is known as the basic plumage. Many species undertake another moult prior to the breeding season known as the pre-alternate moult, the resulting breeding plumage being known as the alternate plumage or nuptial plumage. The alternate plumage is often brighter than the basic plumage, for the purposes of sexual display, but may also be cryptic to hide incubating birds that might be vulnerable on the nest.

The Humphrey–Parkes terminology requires some attention to detail to name moults and plumages correctly.

Eclipse plumage

Many male ducks have bright, colourful plumage, exhibiting strong sexual dimorphism. However, they moult into a dull plumage after breeding in mid-summer. This drab, female-like appearance is called eclipse plumage. When they shed feathers to go into eclipse, the ducks become flightless for a short period of time. Some duck species remain in eclipse for one to three months in the late summer and early fall, while others retain the cryptic plumage until the next spring when they undergo another moult to return to their breeding plumage.

Although mainly found in the Anatidae, a few other species, including related red junglefowl, most fairywrens and some sunbirds also have an eclipse plumage. In the superb and splendid fairywrens, very old males (over about four years) may moult from one nuptial plumage to another whereas in the red-backed and white-winged fairywrens, males do not acquire nuptial plumage until four years of age – well after they become sexually mature and indeed longer than the vast majority of individuals live.

In contrast to the ducks, males of hummingbirds and most lek-mating passerines – like the Guianan cock-of-the-rock or birds of paradise – retain their exuberant plumage and sexual dimorphism at all times, moulting as ordinary birds do once annually.

Abnormal plumages

There are hereditary as well as non-hereditary variations in plumage that are rare and termed as abnormal or aberrant plumages. Melanism refers to an excess of black or dark colours. Erythromelanism or erythrism is the result of excessive reddish brown erythromelanin deposition in feathers that normally lack melanin. Melanin of different forms combine with xanthophylls to produce colour mixtures and when this combination is imbalanced it produces colour shifts that are termed as schizochroisms (including xanthochromism – overabundance of yellow – and axanthism – lack of yellow – which are commonly bred in cagebirds such as budgerigars). A reduction in eumelanin leads to non-eumelanin schizochroism with an overall fawn plumage while a lack of phaeomelanin results in grey coloured non-phaeomelanin schizochroism. Carotenism refers to abnormal distribution of carotenoid pigments.

The term "dilution" is used for situations where the colour is of a lower intensity overall; it is caused by decreased deposition of pigment in the developing feather, and can thus not occur in structural coloration (i.e., "dilute blue" does not exist); pale structural colors are instead achieved by shifting the peak wavelength at which light is refracted. Dilution regularly occurs in normal plumage (grey, buff, pink and cream colours are usually produced by this process), but may in addition occur as an aberration (e.g., all normally black plumage becoming grey).

In some birds – many true owls (Strigidae), some nightjars (Caprimulgidae) and a few cuckoos (Cuculus and relatives) being widely known examples – there is colour polymorphism. This means that two or more colour variants are numerous within their populations during all or at least most seasons and plumages; in the above-mentioned examples a brown (phaeomelanin) and grey (eumelanin) morph exist, termed "hepatic form" particularly in the cuckoos. Other cases of natural polymorphism are of various kinds; many are melanic/nonmelanic (some paradise-flycatchers, Terpsiphone, for example), but more unusual types of polymorphism exist – the face colour of the Gouldian finch (Erythrura gouldiae) or the courtship types of male ruffs (Philomachus pugnax).

Albinism 
Albinism in birds is rare, occurring to any extent in perhaps one in 1800 individuals. It involves loss of colour in all parts including the iris of the eyes, bills, skin, legs, and feet. It is usually the result of a genetic mutation causing the absence of tyrosinase, an enzyme essential for melanin synthesis. Leucism (which includes what used to be termed as "partial albinism") refers to loss of pigments in some or all parts of feathers. A bird that is albino (from the Latin albus, "white") has white feathers in place of coloured ones on some portion of its body. A bird that is naturally white, such as a swan, goose, or egret, is not an albino, nor is a bird that has seasonally alternating white plumage.

Four degrees of albinism have been described. The most common form is termed partial albinism, in which local areas of the bird's body, such as certain feathers, are lacking the pigment melanin. The white areas may be symmetrical, with both sides of the bird showing a similar pattern.  In imperfect albinism, the pigment is partially inhibited in the skin, eyes, or feathers, but is not absent from any of them. Incomplete albinism is the complete absence of pigment from the skin, eyes, or feathers, but not all three.

A completely albino bird is the most rare. The eyes in this case are pink or red, because blood shows through in the absence of pigment in the irises. The beak, legs, and feet are very pale or white. Albino adults are rare in the wild because their eyesight is poor resulting in greater risk of predation. They are likely easier targets for predators because their colour distinguishes them from their environment. Falconers have observed that their trained birds are likely to attack a white pigeon in a flock because it is conspicuous. A complete albino often has weak eyesight and brittle wing and tail feathers, which may reduce its ability to fly. In flocks, albinos are often harassed by their own species. Such observations have been made among red-winged blackbirds, barn swallows, and African penguins. In a nesting colony of the latter, three unusual juveniles—one black-headed, one white-headed, and one full albino—were shunned and abused by companions.

Albinism has been reported in all orders and in 54 families of North American birds. The American robin and house sparrow led bird species in the incidence of albinism. Albinistic white appears to replace brown pigments more often than red or yellow ones; records suggest a greater incidence in crows, ravens, and hawks than in goldfinches or orioles.

Several kinds of albinism in chickens has been described: A complete albinism controlled by an autosomal recessive gene and two different kinds of partial albinism. One of the partial albinisms is sex-linked and the other is autosomal recessive. A fourth kind of albinism severely reduce pigmentation in the eyes, but only dilutes the pigment in the plumage.

Abnormally white feathers are not always due to albinism. Injury or disease may change their color, including dietary deficiencies or circulatory problems during feather development. Aging may also turn a bird's feathers white.

Hen feathering in cocks

Hen feathering in cocks is a genetically conditioned character in domestic fowl (Gallus gallus domesticus). Males with this condition develop a female-type plumage, although otherwise look and respond like virile males. In some breeds, one can see males that have a plumage completely similar in all aspects to that of females. The trait is controlled by a simple autosomic dominant gene, whose expression is limited to the male sex. The condition is due to an enhanced activity of the aromatase complex of enzymes responsible for estrogen synthesis. So estrogen formation in the skin is as much as several hundred-fold higher than that of normal chickens.

Pigmentation conditions 
 Albinism, the lack of melanin pigmentation
 Leucism, a condition similar to albinism in animals, characterized by reduced pigmentation in general
 Melanism (or melanosis), unusually dark melanin pigmentation
 Xanthochromism, unusually yellow pigmentation
 Ino budgerigar mutation, the occurrence of this mutation in captive-bred budgerigars

See also

 Animal coloration
 Hen feathering
 Imping
 Pluma porgy
 Plume hunting
 Sea pen
 Vermiculation

Notes
Males of the white-shouldered and emperor fairywrens of New Guinea do not enter an eclipse plumage.

References

Bird anatomy
Feathers